The following is an alphabetical list of members of the United States House of Representatives from the state of Georgia.  For chronological tables of members of both houses of the United States Congress from the state (through the present day), see United States congressional delegations from Georgia. The list of names should be complete, but other data may be incomplete.

Current representatives 
Current as of January 3, 2023.
 : Buddy Carter (R) (since 2015)
 : Sanford Bishop (D) (since 1993)
 : Drew Ferguson (R) (since 2017)
 : Hank Johnson (D) (since 2007)
 : Nikema Williams (D) (since 2021)
 : Rich McCormick (R) (since 2023)
 : Lucy McBath (D) (since 2019)
 : Austin Scott (R) (since 2011)
 : Andrew Clyde (R) (since 2021)
 : Mike Collins (R) (since 2023)
 : Barry Loudermilk (R) (since 2015)
 : Rick W. Allen (R) (since 2015)
 : David Scott (D) (since 2003)
 : Marjorie Taylor Greene (R) (since 2021)

List of members

See also

List of United States senators from Georgia
United States congressional delegations from Georgia
Georgia's congressional districts

References

Georgia
Georgia
Representatives